10 (Greek: Δέκα; English: Ten) is the tenth studio album by Greek singer Nikos Oikonomopoulos. It was released on 8 December 8, 2017 by Minos EMI. and was received 2× Platinum certification.

Track listing

Singles

"Einai Kati Laika"
The song was released as a digital download on 7 November 2016 and is the lead single of the album. The video clip of the song was announced on 25 November 2016.

"O Haraktiras"
The single was released onto YouTube and released as a digital download on 7 June 2017.

"Gia Kapoio Logo"
The song was released as a digital download on 16 October 2017. The video clip of the song was announced on 16 October 2017.

"Parakala Na Pethano"
"Parakala Na Pethano" is the fourth single. The song was released as a radio single on 25 January 2018 to all radio stations in Greece.

"Gia Paradeigma"
 This is the fifth single and the third song with a video clip from the album. A music video for "Gia Paradeigma" is directed by Yiannis Papadakos and was announced on 15 May 2018.

Charts

Credits and Personnel
Personnel

 Arrangement, Keyboards, Programming: Christos Dantis (tracks: 4, 6, 8, 10), Konstantinos Pantzis (tracks: 4, 6, 8, 10), Maria Papadopoulou (tracks: 1, 3), Leonidas Tzitzos (tracks: 2, 5, 7, 9)
 Backing vocals: Akis Diximos (tracks: 5, 6, 8, 9, 10), Ismini Leivada (tracks: 1), Athena Manoukian (tracks: 1), Despina Tata (tracks: 8, 10)
 Baglama: Panagiotis Stergiou (tracks: 6)
 Bouzouki: Manolis Karantinis (tracks: 1), Panagiotis Stergiou (tracks: 6)
 Bass: Giannis Grigoriou (tracks: 1, 3, 4, 6, 7, 8, 9)
 Cümbüş, Säzi: Stavros Papagiannakopoulos (tracks: 5)
 Drums: Dimitris Antoniadis (tracks: 7, 9), Kostas Liolios (tracks: 4), Alkis Misirlis (tracks: 1, 3)
 Guitar: Christos Dantis (tracks: 4, 6, 8), Antonis Gounaris (4, 6, 8, 10), Giorgos Retikas (tracks: 2, 5, 7, 9), Evripidis Zemenidis (tracks: 1, 3)
 Percussion: Tasos Limperis (tracks: 5)
 Saxophone: Lefteris Pouliou (tracks: 10)
 Violin: Christos Mpousdoukos (tracks: 5)

Production
 Art direction: Dimitris Panagiotakopoulos
 Executive producer: Nikos Oikonomopoulos
 Grooming: Vasilis Mpouloumpasis
 Make Up: Elena Chatzinikolidou
 Mastering: Giorgos Antoniou [D.P.H.] (tracks: 5, 7, 9), Takis Argiriou [111 studio] (tracks: 2), Giannis Christodoulatos [Sweetspot studio] (tracks: 3), Giannis Ioannidis [D.P.H.] (tracks: 5, 7, 9), Konstantinos Pantzis [Power studio] (tracks: 4, 6, 8, 10), Anestis Psaradakos [Athens Mastering] (tracks: 1)
 Mixing, Recording: Takis Argiriou [111 studio] (tracks: 2, 5, 7, 9), Kostas Kalimeris [Prism studio] (tracks: 1, 3), Konstantinos Pantzis [Power studio] (tracks: 4, 6, 8, 10)
 Photographer: Panos Giannakopoulos
 Recording [Vocals]: Takis Argiriou [111 studio]
 Styling: Giannis Trakas

References

2017 albums
Nikos Oikonomopoulos albums
Minos EMI albums
Greek-language albums